Anrune Weyers (née Liebenberg, born 3 November 1992), is a South African para-athlete. She took up athletics in 2010. Weyers was born with a congenital defect in her left arm and competes in the T47 disability class. At the 2011 IPC Athletics World Championships she came second in the 400 m and sixth in the 200 m. In 2012, she won two medals at the London Paralympics, namely silver in the 400 m and bronze in the 200 m. Later that year these medals were stolen while she was travelling from George airport in the Western Cape. At the 2013 IPC World Championships she came second in both the 200 m and the 400 m.

At the 2015 IPC World Championships, she won the 400 m, and at the 2016 Rio Paralympics she won silver in both the 200 m and 400 m. Weyers won gold in the 400 m, silver in the 200 m and bronze in the 100 m at the 2019 World Para Athletics Championships in Dubai, and set the world record of 55.60 s for the 400 m at the Flanders Cup in Huizengin, Belgium in August 2019.

Weyers won gold in the 400 m T47 in Tokyo in 2021 (her third Paralympics) in a season's best time of 56.05 s.

Personal life
Weyers is a Christian. Weyers is married to Stefan Weyers.

References

External links 
 

1992 births
Living people
Sportspeople from Johannesburg
South African female sprinters
Sprinters with limb difference
Sportswomen with disabilities
South African amputees
Paralympic athletes of South Africa
Paralympic silver medalists for South Africa
Paralympic bronze medalists for South Africa
Athletes (track and field) at the 2012 Summer Paralympics
Medalists at the 2012 Summer Paralympics
Athletes (track and field) at the 2016 Summer Paralympics
Medalists at the 2016 Summer Paralympics
World Para Athletics Championships winners
Paralympic medalists in athletics (track and field)
Athletes (track and field) at the 2020 Summer Paralympics
Medalists at the 2020 Summer Paralympics